Boys on the Side  is a 1995 American comedy-drama film directed by Herbert Ross (in his final film as a director). It stars Whoopi Goldberg, Drew Barrymore, and Mary-Louise Parker as three friends on a cross-country road trip. The screenplay was written by Don Roos.

Plot
Jane, a musician who recently broke-up with her girlfriend and her band, decides to move from New York City to Los Angeles. She answers a newspaper ad for a co-driver to Los Angeles posted by Robin, a real estate agent who is also moving to California. Jane initially declines to join her on the road, but agrees after her car gets towed. Jane and Robin begin their journey and make a stop in Pittsburgh to see Jane's friend, Holly.

Jane and Robin witness a fight between Holly and her abusive boyfriend Nick about missing drugs. The three fight Nick when he assaults Holly in an argument over drugs. Holly hits Nick in the head with a bat to stop him from attacking Jane and knocks him out. They tape Nick to a chair with duct tape, put three hours worth of loud music on his stereo to give themselves a head start. Holly snaps a Polaroid of herself with the tied and bound Nick before they leave.

Hours later, Nick frees himself but falls, hits his head on the bat again and dies from his injuries. Robin sees a newspaper with the report of his death the next day. They debate what to do. When Holly confesses she’s also pregnant, and afraid of being arrested for murder, everyone decides to continue on to California together.

During a stop in Tucson, Arizona, Robin collapses at a local diner and is rushed to hospital for pneumonia. A doctor informs Jane and Holly that Robin has HIV as well as pneumonia. They decide to stay in Tucson and start new lives there.

Robin’s health improves, Jane gets a job singing in a bar and Holly falls in love with a local police officer named Abe Lincoln.

Robin, Holly, and their new friends throw a surprise birthday party for Jane. Robin surprises Jane afterward with a new piano. Jane plays The Carpenters “Superstar”, unaware that Robin is watching from the shadows. Robin realizes Jane is in love with her.

Their idyllic life is short-lived. Jane and Robin's friendship crumbles when Jane, with the best of intentions, tells a friendly bartender who’s interested in Robin, that she has HIV. Feeling betrayed, Robin asks Jane to move out. When Abe proposes to Holly, Holly confesses about Nick. Abe finds the photo Holly took and arrests her, despite his vow that he still intends to marry her. Holly is returned to Pittsburgh to stand trial for murder. Jane and Robin follow her to Pittsburgh and make peace with each other in the courthouse. Holly accepts a plea bargain offer of involuntary manslaughter with one to two years in prison. Robin collapses after the trial from a lung infection, and in the hospital, Jane and Robin pledge love for each other.

Holly gives birth to a daughter named Mary Todd and finishes serving her sentence.  She and Abe marry and return to the house in Tucson for a welcome home party. Holly is shocked to find Robin weakened by the advanced stage of AIDS and in a wheelchair. At the party, Robin weakly tries to sing the Roy Orbison song "You Got It" to Jane, and Jane gently finishes the song.

In the final scene, Robin has died from AIDS, Holly and Abe plan to stay in Arizona and raise a family, and Jane hits the road to seek a new life in Los Angeles.

Cast
 Whoopi Goldberg as Jane DeLuca
 Mary-Louise Parker as Robin Nickerson
 Drew Barrymore as Holly Pulchik
 Matthew McConaughey as Abe Lincoln
 James Remar as Alex
 Billy Wirth as Nick
 Anita Gillette as Elaine Nickerson
 Dennis Boutsikaris as Massarelli, Prosecuting Attorney
 Estelle Parsons as Louise
 Amy Aquino as Anna

Reception
Boys on the Side received a positive response from critics.  The film was entered into the 19th Moscow International Film Festival.

Film critic Roger Ebert gave the film 3-and-a-half stars, writing:The reviews for "Boys on the Side" will mention Fried Green Tomatoes and Thelma and Louise, because it shares their assorted themes: female bonding, unexpressed love, women on the run. But this movie is not a collection of parts from other films. It's an original, and what it does best is show how strangers can become friends, and friends can become like family.<p>

To get to know someone is very difficult, but if you really do, they should be able to tell you almost anything, and ask you almost anything, and that is where "Boys on the Side" is leading us.

Box office
The film was not a major box office hit and grossed $23.4 million in the United States and Canada and $47.4 million worldwide.

Soundtrack

The film's soundtrack album consists entirely of contributions from female musicians, including Melissa Etheridge ("I Take You With Me"), Joan Armatrading ("Willow") and the Indigo Girls ("Power of Two").  Hit singles by Annie Lennox ("Why") and The Cranberries ("Dreams") also appear, as are new recordings by Sheryl Crow, Sarah McLachlan, Stevie Nicks, The Pretenders, and  others.  Bonnie Raitt's cover of the Roy Orbison hit "You Got It" peaked at #33 on the Billboard Hot 100 singles chart.

Track listing
 Bonnie Raitt - "You Got It" (Jeff Lynne, Roy Orbison, Tom Petty) – 3:27
 Melissa Etheridge - "I Take You with Me" (Etheridge) – 4:50
 Sheryl Crow - "Keep On Growing" (Eric Clapton, Bobby Whitlock) – 5:27
 Indigo Girls - "Power of Two" (Emily Saliers) – 5:23
 Stevie Nicks - "Somebody Stand By Me" (Sheryl Crow, Todd Wolfe) – 5:06
 Pretenders - "Everyday Is Like Sunday" (Morrissey, Stephen Street) – 3:42
 The Cranberries - "Dreams" (Dolores O'Riordan, Noel Hogan) – 4:32
 Annie Lennox - "Why" (Lennox) – 4:54
 Sarah McLachlan - "Ol' '55" (Tom Waits) – 4:14
 Joan Armatrading - "Willow" (Armatrading) – 4:04
 Jonell Mosser - "Crossroads" (Robert Johnson) – 2:49
 Whoopi Goldberg - "You Got It" (Lynne, Orbison, Petty) – 3:03
 Bonnie Raitt - "You Got It" (Lynne, Orbison, Petty) – 3:26

There are several songs from the film that are not included on the official soundtrack album, such as Toni Childs' version of "Take Me To The River" and Boxing Gandhis' version of "Magic Carpet Ride".

References

External links
 
 
 
 
 

1990s female buddy films
1995 LGBT-related films
1990s road comedy-drama films
1995 films
American female buddy films
American LGBT-related films
American road comedy-drama films
Fictional portrayals of the Pittsburgh Bureau of Police
Films directed by Herbert Ross
Films scored by David Newman
Films set in Pennsylvania
Films set in Pittsburgh
Films set in Arizona
Films shot in New Jersey
Films shot in New York (state)
Films shot in Pennsylvania
HIV/AIDS in American films
Indigo Girls
Lesbian-related films
Regency Enterprises films
Films with screenplays by Don Roos
Warner Bros. films
LGBT-related comedy-drama films
Films produced by Arnon Milchan
1990s English-language films
1990s American films